Mrs Dalloway is a 1997 British drama film, a co-production by the United Kingdom, the United States, and the Netherlands, directed by Marleen Gorris and stars Vanessa Redgrave, Natascha McElhone and Michael Kitchen.

Based on the 1925 novel by Virginia Woolf, and moving continually between the present and the past that is in the characters' heads, it covers a day in the life of Mrs Dalloway, wife of a prosperous politician in London.

Plot
On a beautiful morning in 1923, Clarissa Dalloway sets out from her large house in Westminster to choose the flowers for a party she is holding that evening. Her teenage daughter Elizabeth is unsympathetic, preferring the company of the evangelical Miss Kilman. A passionate old suitor, Peter Walsh, turns up and does not disguise the mess he has made of his career and his love life. For Clarissa this confirms her choice in preferring the unexciting but affectionate and dependable Richard Dalloway. At her party Sally turns up, who was her closest friend, so close they kissed on the lips, but is now wife of a self-made millionaire and mother of five.

Intercut with Clarissa's present and past is the story of another couple. Septimus was a decorated officer in the First World War but is now collapsing under the strain of delayed shell-shock, in which he is paralysed by horrible flashbacks and consumed with guilt over the death of his closest comrade. His wife Rezia tries to get him psychiatric help but the doctors she consults are little use: when one commits him to a mental hospital, he jumps from a window to his death. The doctor turns up late at Clarissa's party, apologising because he had to attend to a patient's suicide. Clarissa stands by a window and ponders what it would mean to jump.

Cast
 Vanessa Redgrave – Mrs Clarissa Dalloway
 Natascha McElhone – Young Clarissa
 Michael Kitchen – Peter Walsh
 Alan Cox – Young Peter
 Sarah Badel – Lady Rosseter
 Lena Headey – Young Sally
 John Standing – Richard Dalloway
 Robert Portal – Young Richard
 Oliver Ford Davies – Hugh Whitbread
 Hal Cruttenden – Young Hugh
 Rupert Graves – Septimus Warren Smith
 Amelia Bullmore – Rezia Warren Smith
 Margaret Tyzack – Lady Bruton
 Robert Hardy – Sir William Bradshaw
 Richenda Carey – Lady Bradshaw
 Katie Carr – Elizabeth Dalloway
 Selina Cadell – Miss Kilman
 Amanda Drew – Lucy
 Phyllis Calvert – Aunt Helena

Reception
The film grossed £200,892 ($0.3 million) in the United Kingdom. In the United States and Canada, it grossed $3,309,421. Mrs Dalloway received positive reviews from critics. Review aggregation website Rotten Tomatoes gives the film an approval rating of 71% based on 34 reviews.

References

External links

1997 films
1990s historical drama films
British historical drama films
Films based on British novels
Films directed by Marleen Gorris
Films set in London
Virginia Woolf in performing arts
Films set in the 1920s
Films about post-traumatic stress disorder
British LGBT-related films
LGBT-related drama films
1997 LGBT-related films
1990s English-language films
1990s British films